The 1976 Northern Illinois Huskies football team represented Northern Illinois University as a member of the Mid-American Conference (MAC) during 1976 NCAA Division I football season. Led by first-year head coach Pat Culpepper, the Huskies compiled an overall record of 1–10 with a mark of 0–6 in conference play, placing last out of ten teams in the MAC. Northern Illinois played home games at Huskie Stadium in DeKalb, Illinois.

Schedule

References

Northern Illinois
Northern Illinois Huskies football seasons
Northern Illinois Huskies football